Arayyez-e Ahmadi (also Romanized as ‘Arayyeẕ-e Aḩmadī; also known as Aḩmadī, Ahmadia, Aḩmadīyeh, Boneh-ye Aḩmadī, and Buneh-ye Ahmadī) is a village in Howmeh-ye Gharbi Rural District, in the Central District of Ramhormoz County, Khuzestan Province, Iran. At the 2006 census, its population was 271, in 48 families.

References 

Populated places in Ramhormoz County